The nanometre (international spelling as used by the International Bureau of Weights and Measures; SI symbol: nm) or nanometer (American spelling) is a unit of length in the International System of Units (SI), equal to one billionth (short scale) of a metre and to 1000 picometres.

History

Etymology

Usage
Nanotechnologies are based on phenomena typically occurring on a scale of nanometres (see nanoscopic scale).

The nanometre is often used to express dimensions on an atomic scale: the diameter of a helium atom, for example, is about 0.06 nm, and that of a ribosome is about 20 nm. The nanometre is also commonly used to specify the wavelength of electromagnetic radiation near the visible part of the spectrum: visible light ranges from around 400 to 700 nm. The ångström, which is equal to 0.1 nm, was formerly used for these purposes.

Since the late 1980s, in usages such as the 32 nm and the 22 nm semiconductor node, it has also been used to describe typical feature sizes in successive generations of the ITRS Roadmap for miniaturized semiconductor device fabrication in the semiconductor industry.

Unicode
The CJK Compatibility block in Unicode has the symbol .

References

External links

Near-field Mie scattering in optical trap nanometry

Metre